Målselvdalen is the largest valley in Troms og Finnmark county, Norway. The river Målselva runs through the valley, ending at the Målselvfjorden (an arm off the main Malangen fjord).

With a landscape reminiscent of that of the Østerdalen valley, the valley was settled in the late eighteenth century by farmers from the Østerdalen and Gudbrandsdalen valleys to the south. The bailiff in the district, Jens Holmboe, was instrumental in settling this region.

References

Valleys of Troms og Finnmark
Målselv